The Shire of Murray is a local government area of Western Australia.

Timber logging and agriculture were the traditional enterprises of the district. However, in recent decades, bauxite mining and a significant equine and tourism industry have emerged. The Murray River flows all year throughout the district. It offers premier country racing and trotting facilities, a golf course and an array of festivals and events.

The Shire is centred on the town of Pinjarra, one of the oldest towns in Western Australia where a number of 19th-century mud brick buildings are still in use today.

History
The area was first settled in 1834 by Sir Thomas Peel. On 7 November 1868, the Murray District Roads Committee had its first meeting in Pinjarra.

The Shire of Murray originated as the Murray Road District, which was gazetted on 25 January 1871. On 1 July 1961, it became the Shire of Murray following the passage of the Local Government Act 1960, which reformed all remaining road districts into shires.

Towns and localities
The towns and localities of the Shire of Murray with population and size figures based on the most recent Australian census:

* Indicates locality is only partially located within the Shire of Murray

  For the purpose of the 2021 Australian census, Oakley was counted as part of Fairbridge.

Population

 At the 1954 census, Mandurah, which had seceded from Murray, had a population of 1,687.

Notable councillors
 John McLarty, Murray Roads Board member 1870; later a state MP
 Edward McLarty, Murray Roads Board member 1875–1915; also a state MP
 William Paterson, Murray Roads Board member 1875–1895; also a state MP

Heritage-listed places

As of 2023, 134 places are heritage-listed in the Shire of Murray, of which 13 are on the State Register of Heritage Places.

Notes

External links
 

 
Murray